In music from Western culture, a diminished octave is an interval produced by narrowing a perfect octave by a chromatic semitone. As such, the two notes are denoted by the same letter but have different accidentals. For instance, the interval from C4 to C5 is a perfect octave, twelve semitones wide, and both the intervals from C4 to C5 and from C4 to C5 are diminished octaves, spanning eleven semitones. Being diminished, it is considered a dissonant interval.

The diminished octave is enharmonically equivalent to the major seventh.

References

Diminished intervals
Octaves